Laggan is a small village on the traditional land of the Gundungurra people in the Southern Tablelands, New South Wales, Australia in Upper Lachlan Shire.

The village/locality has a small primary school, the Laggan Pub, a fine dining restaurant Laggan Pantry and a micro brewery Laggan Brewing Co. 
There are many historic buildings including the old police barracks c1837 and a rebuilt mill. Also there are the monthly Laggan Village Markets at the memorial hall. 

Laggan was founded for pastoral use, as well as a stop for convicts during the building of roads between Bathurst and Goulburn. The village is now a tourist attraction.

Annual ploughing matches were held at Laggan in the 1860s.

Hotels

Rose, Thistle and Shamrock Inn
One of the earliest hotels in Laggan was the Rose, Thistle and Shamrock Inn, owned by R. J. Sheriff, he had it up for auction in 1855, in which the advertisement stated it was a stone house. Daniel O'Brien was the owner in Jan 1859, and by 1883 was granted the publicans licence.

Sportsmans Arms
The Sportsmans Arms that was in operation in 1863 and licensed by John S. Paris, and previously by Sir Colin Campbell. By October 1865, Robert Stephenson, was granted the publicans licence and held it until 27  May 1874 when Thomas McCormack was granted the publicans licence.

Churches

Church of England
The foundation stone for the Church of England at Laggan was laid on the 5 November 1922. Engraved on the stone:-"A. D. M. G. All Saints: Laggan. This stone was laid by the Lord Bishop of Goulburn on Nov. 5th 1922."

Presbyterian Church
The Presbyterian Church at Laggan was opened on the 14 December 1876; the foundation stone having been laid about six months earlier.

Roman Catholic Church
The Roman Catholic Church at Laggan was built in the Gothic style, and was opened by Rev. Father McAlroy on 26 March 1865.
A new Roman Catholic Church building in McAlister Road was opened on 21 June 1925 by Dr. Barry.

References

Upper Lachlan Shire
Southern Tablelands
Localities in New South Wales